Kozlov is a rural locality (a khutor) in Krasnyanskoye Rural Settlement, Kumylzhensky District, Volgograd Oblast, Russia. The population was 213 as of 2010. There are 4 streets.

Geography 
Kozlov is located in forest steppe, on Khopyorsko-Buzulukskaya Plain, 46 km southeast of Kumylzhenskaya (the district's administrative centre) by road. Krasnyansky is the nearest rural locality.

References 

Rural localities in Kumylzhensky District